Nogami (written: 野上) is a Japanese surname. Notable people with the surname include:

 Akira Nogami (born 1966), Japanese professional wrestler and actor
 Hisashi Nogami (born 1971) Japanese video game designer, director and producer
, Japanese long-distance runner
, Japanese sailor
 Nogami Tohru (born 1935), Japanese photographer
 Ryoma Nogami (born 1987), Nippon Professional Baseball pitcher
 Takao Nogami (born 1971), Japanese professional golfer
 Yaeko Nogami (1885–1985), Japanese novelist
 Yoshiji Nogami (born 1942), Japanese diplomat
 Yukana Nogami (born 1975), Japanese voice actress and singer
 Yuki Nogami (born 1991), Japanese football player

Fictional characters:
 Ryotaro Nogami, Kotaro Nogami and Airi Nogami, characters in Kamen Rider Den-O
 Saeko Nogami, character in the anime and manga series City Hunter

See also
 Nogami Station

Japanese-language surnames